Bongani Mwelase (born 23 August 1982) is a South African former boxer who became the 2006 Commonwealth amateur champion at welterweight.

Amateur
The hard-punching southpaw failed to qualify for the 2004 Athens Games by ending up in third place at the 2nd AIBA African 2004 Olympic Qualifying Tournament in Gaborone, Botswana. He won the Commonwealth boxing championships in Glasgow 2005 and the Commonwealth Games 2006. In the final 2006 he beat Vijender Singh who received a standing 8 count 33–26. He is South Africa's first black Commonwealth boxing champion.

Pro
He is undefeated 10–0 as a pro but was knocked down twice by Lucky Lewele in his South African title win, his first 12-round bout.

He retired from boxing in 2011, citing exploitation and racism by promotors who mistreated black boxers.

References

External links
Commonwealth 2006

1982 births
Living people
Welterweight boxers
Boxers at the 2006 Commonwealth Games
Commonwealth Games gold medallists for South Africa
South African male boxers
Commonwealth Games medallists in boxing
Medallists at the 2006 Commonwealth Games